The 2002 Dakar Rally, also known as the 2002 Arras–Madrid–Dakar Rally was the 24th running of the Dakar Rally event. The format of the rally was revised for 2002 with the introduction of two-day stages and two stages without the use of navigation aids. The race started in Arras in northern France on 28 December 2001 and finished at Dakar in Senegal on 13 January 2002. The 1999 and 2000 winner, Jean-Louis Schlesser, switched from a petrol powered vehicle to a diesel powered one in a bid to make the vehicle lighter However, he was forced to retire from the rally during the sixth stage from Er-Rachidia to Ouarzazate in Morocco while lying 11th overall when his vehicle caught fire. Japanese driver Hiroshi Masuoka took the lead at the sixth stage, and went on to win the rally. The motorcycle category was won by Fabrizio Meoni for the second successive year.

Stages

  - Stages cancelled for trucks due to poor weather conditions.

Stage Results

Motorcycles

 Source:

Cars

  - Peterhansel had a 14-minute penalty added to his time as a result of speeding in the liaison section.
  - De Mévius earned an 18-minute penalty for failing to complete the liaison section in the allotted time.
 Source:

Trucks

  - All competitors awarded a stage time of 50:00.
 Source:

Final standings

Motorcycles

Cars

Trucks

References

Dakar Rally
D
Dakar Rally, 2002
2002 in French motorsport